Yi Seok (born 3 August 1941) is a member of royalty  from the House of Yi, the royal house of Joseon and Korean Empire. He is the 10th son of Prince Yi Kang, the fifth son of Emperor Gojong of Korea, and one of his consorts, Lady Hong Chŏng-sun, a former telephone operator. In his early life, Yi gained fame as a singer, known as the "singing prince", and he released a 1967 album Pigeon House. Since 2004, he has been employed by the city of Jeonju to promote tourism. He also serves as a professor of history at Jeonju University.

As an activist on monarchy restoration, Yi Seok promotes his concept to create a constitutional monarchy within the existing constitutional and presidential system. He suggests restoring the Imperial family for their symbolic value.

Yi Seok founded an organization "Korean Imperial Family Cultural Foundation" in August 2006 to support this proposal. Yi Seok's guesthouse, as well as his residence,  in Jeonju Hanok Village, was once visited by former president Roh Moo-hyun, President Moon Jae-in with his wife, and Park Won-soon (Mayor of Seoul) and Amb. Harry B. Harris Jr. In May 2016, Yi Seok became the brand ambassador of Liancourt Rocks by Ulleung County.

An article on the official website of South Korea, Korea.net, referred to Yi Seok as one of two pretenders to the throne and the only one living in Korea.

Biography

Early life

Yi Seok was born in Chōsen, on 30 August 1941. His father Yi Kang was 62 and his mother, Lady Hong, was 19. The place he was born, Sadong Palace (사동궁), was lost after 1945. The rising of the Syngman Rhee government resulted in the confiscation of many of their family properties. After the outbreak of the Korean War, Yi Seok and his family fled from their residence in Samcheong-dong and were reduced to poverty.

At the beginning of the era of Republic of Korea, the Imperial family was banished from the Imperial palace. Their lives became better after the president Park Chung Hee gained power. When studying Hankook University of Foreign Studies in Seoul, Yi Seok learned foreign languages, principally Spanish, and became fluent. He also studied foreign relations and history, to prepare for the diplomatic service. A series of coups d'état and civil discord made that impossible. 

In the 1960s he used his musical talent to become a well-known singer and professional musician while in his twenties, having several hit songs. Later, Yi Seok volunteered for the Korean military and served as an enlisted man in the Vietnam War. During the war, Yi Seok was wounded and needed to return to Korea; around the same time, his mother died of stomach cancer. Yi Seok was 26; severely depressed, he attempted suicide nine times. After President Park was assassinated in 1979, the government's subsidy to the royal family was discontinued. Yi Seok tried various jobs to support himself. In the 1980s he moved to the United States as an illegal immigrant, doing jobs including lawn mowing and cleaning swimming pools and buildings. At the same time he attempted to retrieve family properties seized by the republic. Under postwar Korean law, these are no longer able to be claimed. With the changing political climate in the early 1990s, Yi Seok returned to Korea. The Korean Broadcasting System (KBS) produced a semi-fictional TV programme of his life.

Recent activities
In April 2004, his eldest daughter Yi Hong performed for the first time in a singing show from SBS, and Yi Seok starred on stage with her as celebration. 

By August of the same year, Yi Seok started to run a guesthouse SeungKwangJae (승광재) in Jeonju Hanok Village, which is also his current residence. The name reference of the guesthouse is the era name of Emperor Gojong, Kwangmu (光武), and seung (승) stands for "succession". SeungKwangJae is sometimes rented by the government of Jeonju and it was built of wood, similar to the traditional way. Yi Seok runs the place with his supporters. He said, "There are many things to do in Jeonju since this is where the Joseon dynasty founded. I'm going to spread the culture of the royal family and re-illuminate Jeonju's history."

On 16 July 2005, Yi Seok's cousin Yi Ku passed away without an heir. The Jeonju Lee Royal Family Association announced, on July 22, that Yi Won would become Yi Ku's successor, according to his will. During the funeral, an angered Yi Seok commented that "the funeral is not yet ended, and it's inappropriate to discuss about adopting an heir by now". Later, Yi Seok claimed that "adopting a son after death doesn’t make any sense," and he also claimed that Yi Bangja, his late aunt and the mother of Yi Ku, named him as "first successor" in her will. 

In August 2006, to support his goal of monarchy restoration, Yi Seok founded the organization "Korean Imperial Family Cultural Foundation" (황실문화재단); he serves as director. Yi Hae-won, one of his elder half-sisters, proclaimed herself as an empress and held a coronation on 29 September 2006. Although she invited Yi Seok, he did not attend the ceremony.

The Statue of King Sejong in Gwanghwamun Plaza was erected on 9 October 2009, and Yi Seok attended the unveiling ceremony. According to a talk on 4 September 2014, Yi Seok said that there is no existing contemporary portrait of Sejong the Great. The statue's face was based on that of Yi Seok and a portrait of Grand Prince Hyoryeong, King Sejong's older brother, which is now preserved at Gwanaksan.

On 7 August 2018, Harry B. Harris Jr., the United States Ambassador to South Korea, paid a visit to SeungKwangJae. The mayor of Jeonju, Kim Seung-su (김승수), said, "The prince [Yi Seok] is our history and our spirit. I would like to express my deep gratitude to the ambassadors for visiting this symbolic space."

On October 6, 2018, Yi declared Andrew Lee, a distant Korean-American relative and an entrepreneur, to be the "Korean Crown Prince". Yi's claims that Lee is descended from the Jeonju clan have not been documented.

Family 
Yi Seok married and divorced four times. He is now married to a woman said to be 18 years younger than he. He has two daughters from his previous mariages:
 Yi Hong (이홍, born 1974): Works as an actress in Korea. She married Han Yeong-gwang (한영광), another Korean actor. Their daughter was born in 2001.
 Yi Jin (이진, born 1979): Works on promoting traditional Korean ceramic arts. She lives in Canada.

Quotes

Ancestry

Patrilineal descent

Patrilineal descent is the principle behind membership in royal houses, as it can be traced back through the generations – which means that Yi Seok descended of House of Yi that was from Jeonju Yi clan

 Yi Han, d. 754?
 Yi Jayeon
 Yi Cheonsang
 Yi Gwanghui
 Yi Ipjeon
 Yi Geunghyu
 Yi Yeomsoon
 Yi Seung-sak 
 Yi Chung-kyung
 Yi Kyung-young
 Yi Chung-min
 Yi Hwa
 Yi Jinyu 
 Yi Gung-jin 
 Yi Yong-bu 
 Yi In
 Yi Yang-mu, d. 1231
 Yi Ansa, d. 1274 
 Yi Haeng-ri
 Yi Chun, d. 1342 
 Yi Jachun, 1315-1361
 Taejo of Joseon, 1335-1408
 Taejong of Joseon, 1367-1422
 Sejong of Joseon, 1397-1450
 Sejo of Joseon, 1417-1468
 Crown Prince Uigyeong, 1438-1457
 Seongjong of Joseon, 1457-1495
 Jungjong of Joseon, 1488-1544
 Grand Internal Prince Deokheung, 1530-1559
 Seonjo of Joseon, 1552-1608
 Prince Jeongwon, 1580-1619
 Injo of Joseon, 1595-1649
 Grand Prince Inpyeong, 1622-1658
 Prince Boknyeong, 1639-1670
 Yi Hyuk, Prince Uiwon, 1661-1722
 Yi Sook, Prince Anheung, 1693-1768
 Yi Ji-nik, 1728-1796
 Yi Byeong-won, 1752-1822
 Yi Gu, Prince Namyeon, 1788-1836
 Grand Internal Prince Heungseon, 1820-1898 
 Gojong of Korea, 1852-1919
 Prince Yi Kang, 1877-1955
 Yi Seok, b. 1941

Notes

References 

1941 births
House of Yi
Living people
Korean military personnel of the Vietnam War
Korean anti-communists
People from Jeonju
Korean royalty
Korean nobility